A Little White Wedding Chapel in Las Vegas, Nevada has been the site of many quick celebrity weddings. It is noted for its Drive-Thru Tunnel of Vows. It was established in 1951 or 1955, and has married about 800,000 couples. It employs ten ministers.

Similarly named Las Vegas wedding chapels, such as The Little Church of the West, The Little Chapel by the Courthouse, and the Chapel of the Flowers are often confused with A Little White Wedding Chapel.  The Little Chapel by the Courthouse is also owned by We've Only Just Begun Inc., also the owners of A Little White Wedding Chapel. Charolette Richards, the owner, also has had association with the Little Church of the West.

Richards has worked at the chapel since the late 1950s. She came into the wedding business after her first husband abandoned her in Las Vegas, and Merle Edwards, who worked in the wedding chapel business, rescued her from the street and soon after became her second husband. He died in 1982. She has presided over the marriages of Frank Sinatra, Judy Garland, Mickey Rooney, Michael Jordan, Britney Spears, Bruce Willis and Demi Moore.

The chapel has been featured on such TV shows as WWE Raw, Supernatural, Friends and Good Morning America. Michael Ross and Naomi Defensor, two cast members on the 2011 season of The Real World: Las Vegas, participated in a mock wedding at the Chapel during the June 1, 2011 season finale of that series.

Notable weddings 

 Paul Newman and Joanne Woodward (January 29, 1958)
 Judy Garland and Mark Herron (November 14, 1965) 
 Frank Sinatra and Mia Farrow (July 19, 1966)
 Patty Duke and Michael Tell (June 26, 1970)
 Joan Collins and Peter Holm (November 3, 1985)
 Bruce Willis and Demi Moore (November 21, 1987)
 Michael Jordan and Juanita Vanoy (September 2, 1989)
 David Faustino and Andrea Elmer (January 24, 2000) 
 Natalie Maines and Adrian Pasdar (June 24, 2000)
 Stone Cold Steve Austin and Debra Marshall (September 13, 2000)
 Eva Longoria and Tyler Christopher (January 20, 2002)
 Britney Spears and Jason Allen Alexander (January 3, 2004)
 Henry Thomas and Marie Zielcke (May 10, 2004)
 Rufus Hound and Beth Johnson (April 2007)
 Pamela Anderson and Rick Salomon (October 6, 2007)
 Peaches Geldof and Max Drummey (August 5, 2008)
 Christina Milian and The-Dream (September 4, 2009)
 Jordan Chan and Cherrie Ying (February 14, 2010)
 Nik Richie and Shayne Lamas (April 18, 2010)
 Charlie Brooker and Konnie Huq (July 26, 2010) 
 Russell Peters and Monica Diaz (August 20, 2010)
 Sinéad O'Connor  and  Barry Herridge (December 8, 2011)
 Eugenia Martínez de Irujo and Narcís Rebollo Melció (November 17, 2017)
 Joe Jonas and Sophie Turner (May 1, 2019)
 David Dobrik and Lorraine Nash (May 16, 2019)
 Ben Affleck and Jennifer Lopez (July 17, 2022)

See also 
List of wedding chapels in Las Vegas

References

External links 
A Little White Wedding Chapel

Wedding chapels in the Las Vegas Valley
Buildings and structures in Las Vegas